HR 6801 is a single star in the southern zodiac constellation of Sagittarius. It was designated as 1 Sagittarii by Flamsteed, but is now often referred to as 11 Sagittarii. Flamsteed's 11 Sgr actually refers to a different, much fainter star. The object is orange in hue and is visible to the naked eye as a faint point of light with an apparent visual magnitude of 4.96. The distance to this star is approximately 258 light years based on stellar parallax, and it is drifting further away with a radial velocity of +6 km/s.

This is an aging giant star with a stellar classification of K0III. It is a red clump giant, which indicates it is on the horizontal branch and is generating energy through helium fusion at its core. The star has 2.24 times the mass of the Sun and has expanded to 13.4 times the Sun's radius. It is radiating 79 times the luminosity of the Sun from its photosphere at an effective temperature of 4,705 K.

References

K-type giants
Horizontal-branch stars
Double stars

Sagittarius (constellation)
CD-23 14047
Sagittarii, 01
166464
089153
6801